Baden Chapman Teague (born 18 September 1944) served as a Liberal Senator for South Australia from 1977 until his retirement in 1996. 

Born in Adelaide, Teague was educated at St. Peter’s College, the University of Adelaide and Cambridge University, where he gained a Ph.D.  He was employed as a university lecturer until he entered the Senate in 1977.  Teague narrowly won the final South Australian Senate position from the then newly formed Australian Democrats after preferences from the Australia Party flowed to Teague ahead of the Democrats. Observers with a sense of irony would have noted that many Australian Democrats, including lead Democrat Senate candidate Ian Gilfillan, were former Australia Party members and the Democrats had initially expected Australia Party preferences.

During his Senate term, Teague introduced a private members bill to change the system of government in Australia from a Constitutional Monarchy to a Republic. 

Following his retirement from politics, Teague served as the South Australian Chairman of the Australian Republican Movement, and was elected as a delegate to the Australian Republic Convention.

The Teague family is Cornish, originating in Cornwall, United Kingdom, the name meaning "satisfactory/adorable" in the Cornish language.

References

1944 births
Living people
Liberal Party of Australia members of the Parliament of Australia
Members of the Australian Senate
Members of the Australian Senate for South Australia
Australian people of Cornish descent
20th-century Australian politicians
Australian republicans